Karam Badirkhanovich Sultanov (born 15 April 1996) is a Kazakhstani professional footballer who plays as a defender for FC Ordabasy.

Career 
Sultanov made his Kazakhstan Premier League debut for Kyzylzhar in a 1–0 home victory against Zhetysu on 14 April 2018. 

On 15 August 2020, he signed a 1+1 year contract with Azerbaijan Premier League club Sumgayit FK. On 18 January 2021, Sultanov left Sumgayit by mutual consent.

References

External links
 

1996 births
Living people
Association football defenders
Kazakhstani footballers
Kazakhstani people of Azerbaijani descent
Azerbaijani footballers
Azerbaijani expatriate footballers
Kazakhstan under-21 international footballers
Kazakhstan Premier League players
Azerbaijan Premier League players
FC Caspiy players
Sumgayit FK players
FC Shakhter Karagandy players
FC Ordabasy players
People from Shymkent